Soorakottai Singakutti is a 1983 Indian Tamil-language masala film, directed by Rama Narayanan for AVM Productions. The film stars Prabhu and Silk Smitha, with Vijayakumari, V. K. Ramaswami, Prameela and Gemini Ganesan in supporting roles. It was released on 9 September 1983.

Plot 

Viswanathan, a happily married landlord befriends a dancer. Later she shows her true colours, separates him from his wife and marries him. Meanwhile, Selvam, a vibrant youth hears from his mother about his past and vows to avenge the person who caused injustice to his family. How he manages to do it, is the rest of the story.

Cast 
Prabhu as Selvam
Silk Smitha as Sokki
Gemini Ganesan as Viswanathan
C. R. Vijayakumari as Lakshmi
Prameela as Kalyani
V. K. Ramasamy as Velu
Sangili Murugan as Nondy
Vennira Aadai Moorthy as Marriage Broker
S. S. Chandran as Chengalpattu Senthamarai Pulavar
Bindu Ghosh as Shantha
Omakuchi Narasimhan
Gundu Kalyanam
Ramarajan (Guest Role)

Soundtrack 
Soundtrack was composed by Ilaiyaraaja and lyrics were written by Vaali.

Reception 
S. Shivakumar of Sunday Mid-Day called it "the worst AVM presentation I have ever seen" and went on to write "With absolutely no plot, director Ram Narayan depends on his abundant talent in penning the now proverbial double meaning dialogues to stimulate the baser instincts of the filmmakers 'main food'". The film failed at the box office, partly due to audience's reluctance to accept Smitha as a lead actress.

References

External links 
 

1980s masala films
1980s Tamil-language films
1983 films
AVM Productions films
Films directed by Rama Narayanan
Films scored by Ilaiyaraaja